K.Gangavaram Mandal is one of the  mandals in Konaseema district of Andhra Pradesh. It was called as Pamarru mandal and later renamed. As per census 2011, there are 24 villages.

Demographics 
This mandal has total population of 63,013 as per the Census 2011 out of which 31,835 are males while 31,178 are females and the average Sex Ratio  is 979. The total literacy rate  is 69.15%. The male literacy rate is 65.74% and the female literacy rate is 58.81%.

Towns & Villages

Villages 

Addampalle
Amjuru
Balantharam
Bhatla Palika
Dangeru
Gangavaram
Gudigalla Bhaga
Gudigalla Rallagunta
Koolla
Kota
Kotipalle
Kudupuru
Kunduru
Masakapalle
Pamarru
Paningapalle
Pekeru
Satyawada
Sivala
Sundarapalle
Thamarapalle
Vilasa Gangavaram
Yendagandi
Yerraa Pothavaram
Vakatippa
Nagulacheruvu

See also 
List of mandals in Andhra Pradesh

References 

Mandals in Konaseema district
Mandals in Andhra Pradesh